Tomáš Lešňovský (born 7 October 1993) is a Slovak football goalkeeper who currently plays for the  Námestovo in 3. Liga.

MFK Ružomberok
He made his debut for the Ružomberok senior side on 24 November 2012 in the Corgoň Liga match against Spartak Trnava, coming on as a '57 minute substitute for injured Lukáš Zich, in the 1-0 away win.

External links
MFK Ružomberok profile

References

1993 births
Living people
People from Námestovo
Sportspeople from the Žilina Region
Slovak footballers
Slovakia youth international footballers
Association football goalkeepers
MFK Ružomberok players
1. HFK Olomouc players
MSK Břeclav players
MFK Dolný Kubín players
FK Pohronie players
MŠK Námestovo players
Slovak Super Liga players
2. Liga (Slovakia) players
3. Liga (Slovakia) players
Moravian-Silesian Football League players
Expatriate footballers in the Czech Republic
Slovak expatriate sportspeople in the Czech Republic